Lucrezia Borgia is a 1922 German silent historical film directed by Richard Oswald and starring Conrad Veidt, Liane Haid, Paul Wegener, and Albert Bassermann. It was based on a novel by Harry Sheff, and portrayed the life of the Renaissance Italian aristocrat Lucrezia Borgia (1480–1519). Botho Hoefer and Robert Neppach worked as the film's art directors, designing the period sets needed. It was shot at the Tempelhof Studios in Berlin. Karl Freund was one of the cinematographers. Famed French director Abel Gance remade the film in 1935.

Cesare Borgia (Veidt) is a monstrous villain who will do anything for pleasure and power, even seducing his own sister Lucrezia (Haid) and murdering his male siblings. The Borgias were a medieval family known for their corruption under the rule of Pope Alexander VI. This film version made Lucrezia a more sympathetic character, blaming her brother Cesare for causing her indiscretions. Director Richard Oswald's depiction of the family was seen as an attack on the Catholic Church, thus the film was not able to be shown in the U.S. until 1928, and even then the American prints were edited down to 75 minutes.

Richard Oswald directed a number of classic horror films, including The Picture of Dorian Gray (1917), Weird Tales (1919), The Hound of the Baskervilles (1929), Alraune (1930) and Uncanny Stories (1932), and this historical drama can easily be regarded borderline horror, especially with Conrad Veidt and Paul Wegener in the cast. Actor William Dieterle later moved to Hollywood where he directed the Charles Laughton version of The Hunchback of Notre Dame in 1939.

Cast

References

Bibliography

External links 
 

1922 films
1920s historical drama films
German epic films
German historical drama films
Films of the Weimar Republic
German silent feature films
Films directed by Richard Oswald
Films based on German novels
Films set in Italy
Films set in the 16th century
UFA GmbH films
Cultural depictions of Cesare Borgia
Cultural depictions of Lucrezia Borgia
Cultural depictions of Pope Alexander VI
Films shot at Tempelhof Studios
German black-and-white films
1922 drama films
Silent historical drama films
Silent adventure films
1920s German films
1920s German-language films